R76 may refer to:
 R76 (South Africa), a road
 , a destroyer of the Royal Navy
 , or HMS Mars (R76), an aircraft carrier of the Royal Navy